The MIT Computing Culture Research Group was an applied research group at the MIT Media Lab founded and led by technologist and artist Christopher Csikszentmihályi, who also co-founded the MIT Center for Civic Media. Between 2000 and 2009, Computing Culture focused on "embedding poetic and political considerations in the development of new technologies." Its stated mission read in part:

To refigure what engineering means, how it happens, and what it produces. Drawing on fields from the humanities, like Science and technology studies, we create new technologies that function as instances of material power, but also as exemplars of what future goals engineering should pursue.

Research and development
Computing Culture designed and built tools to comment on technology and its implications for social power dynamics, but also to function when applied. Tools produced within Computing Culture included, but are not limited to:

Afghan eXplorer (Christopher Csikszentmihályi, 2001), a solar-powered, four-wheeled robot designed to report news from warzones.
MarchToWar.com (Tad Hirsch, Ryan McKinley, 2003), a website devoted to wagers on when the United States' military would invade Iraq
Government Information Awareness (Ryan McKinley, Christopher Csikszentmihályi, 2003), a crowdsourced website devoted to identifying connections among United States elected officials and lobbyists
TXTMob (Tad Hirsch, Christopher Csikszentmihályi, Institute for Applied Autonomy, 2003), a SMS-messaging service for mass-protest coordination
Blendie (Kelly Dobson, 2004), an interactive, intelligent, voice-controlled kitchen blender
Freedom Flies (Christopher Csikszentmihályi, 2005), an Unmanned aerial vehicle designed to observe militia activity in the Southwestern United States
Random Search (Ayah Bdeir, 2006), a wearable garment that tracks touch patterns during airport patdowns
RoBoat (Christopher Csikszentmihályi, 2006), a robotic kayak designed to protest at island prisons
Seeing Yellow (Benjamin Mako Hill, 2007), a campaign against computer printer manufacturers' practice of including traceable, invisible yellow dots on printouts

Notable alumni
Computing Culture awarded degrees at the Master's and PhD level. Notable alumni include:

Ayah Bdeir, founder and CEO of LittleBits
Limor Fried, owner, Adafruit Industries
Tad Hirsch, professor, University of Washington School of Art
Benjamin Mako Hill, free software activist, hacker, and author
Saoirse Higgins, practice-based research and lecturer, Orkney Islands

References

Massachusetts Institute of Technology
Scientific organizations established in 2000
2000 establishments in Massachusetts
2000 in computing
Science and technology in Massachusetts